The Kingdom of Boina (sometimes known as Iboina) was a traditional state situated in what is now Madagascar.

History 
The kingdom was founded c. 1690 by King Andriamandisoarivo. Andrimandisoarivo was a son of Lahifotsy, the founder of the Sakalava Kingdom, and had that kingdom after a succession dispute for the north, where he founded his own kingdom. It was centered on Boina Bay in north-west Madagascar. 

By the 1690s about 500 European pirates had set up bases of operation along the northern coast of Madagascar. Andrianamboniarivo had as his chief minister for a time Tom Similaho whose father was an English pirate and whose mother was a Malagasy woman.

Some time after 1832 it was occupied by Imerina and was annexed by Madagascar in 1840. The last ruler of this kingdom was Queen Tsiomeko.

Boina in the north west and Menabe in the west were the kingdoms sprong in the 18th century. The king of Boina was considered to be quasi-divine, interceding with god and ancestors. The land belonged to him. In the extreme north of the island the Antankarana kingdom paid tribute to Boina.

Rulers of Boina
 c. 1690-1720 – Andriamandisoarivo (Tsimanata)
 c. 1720-1730 – Andrianamboniarivo (Toakafa)
 c. 1730-1760 – Andriamahatindriarivo
 c. 1760-1767 – Andrianahilitsy
 1767-1770 – Andrianiveniarivo
 1770-1771 – Andrianihoatra
 1771-1777 – Andrianikeniarivo
 1777-1778 – Andrianaginarivo (f)
 1778 – Tombola (f)
 c. 1778-1808 – Ravahiny (f)
 1808-1822? – Tsimalomo
 1808 – Maka (Andrianaresy) (pretender)
 1822-1832 – Andriantsoly
 1828-1829 – Oantitsy (f) - Regent
 1832-1836 – Oantitsy (f)
 1836-1840 – Tsiomeko (f)

See also
Boeny

References

 Britannica

History of Madagascar
1840s disestablishments in Africa
Former kingdoms
1690 establishments in Africa